Kalynivka is the name of several populated places in Ukraine: 

 Kalynivka, Horlivka Raion, Donetsk Oblast, Donetsk Oblast
 Kalynivka, Brovary Raion, Kyiv Oblast, Kyiv Oblast
 Kalynivka, Fastiv Raion, Kyiv Oblast, Kyiv Oblast
 Kalynivka, Vinnytsia Oblast

See also
 Kalinovka (disambiguation)